Dancing in the Dark is an album by jazz saxophonist Sonny Rollins, released on the Milestone label in 1987, featuring performances by Rollins with Clifton Anderson, Mark Soskin, Jerome Harris and Marvin "Smitty" Smith.

Reception

The Allmusic review by Scott Yanow states: "Although not up to the level of his best live performances, this studio album is quite enjoyable and gives one a clear idea as to how Sonny Rollins sounded in the 1980s."

Track listing
All compositions by Sonny Rollins except as indicated
 "Just Once" (Barry Mann, Cynthia Weil) - 3:26  
 "O.T.Y.O.G." - 4:41  
 "Promise" - 6:29  
 "Duke of Iron" - 4:17  
 "Dancing in the Dark" (Howard Dietz, Arthur Schwartz) - 7:08  
 "I'll String Along with You" (Al Dubin, Harry Warren) - 4:44  
 "Allison" - 7:08  
 "Allison" [alternate take] - 5:32 Bonus track on CD 
Recorded at Fantasy Studios, Berkeley, CA, on September 15–25, 1987

Personnel
Sonny Rollins – tenor saxophone
Clifton Anderson – trombone 
Mark Soskin – piano
Jerome Harris – electric bass, rhythm guitar
Marvin "Smitty" Smith – drums

References

1987 albums
Milestone Records albums
Sonny Rollins albums